is a retired Japanese speed skater. She competed at the 1968 Winter Olympics and finished in 26th and 20th place in 1500 m and 3000 m, respectively.

She is sometimes confused with Sachiko Saito who also competed in speed skating at the 1968 Olympics.

Personal bests:
500 m – 49.3 (1968)
1000 m – 1:38.7 (1968)
1500 m – 2:28.1 (1968)
3000 m – 5:20.5 (1965)

References

External links

Jitsuko SAITO. les-sports.info

1946 births
Japanese female speed skaters
Speed skaters at the 1968 Winter Olympics
Olympic speed skaters of Japan
Sportspeople from Nagano Prefecture
People from Nagano (city)
Living people